Wizbit is a 1980s BBC children's television show about an alien magician, Wizbit. It starred the established TV and stage magician Paul Daniels and his assistant Debbie McGee.

The series is set in Puzzleopolis, a town inhabited by walking, talking sponge-balls, dice, magic wands, playing cards and rabbits, where the protagonists must solve puzzles. Wizbit's year-and-a-day mission is to find out all about planet Earth.

The show is partly educational, with the (often lateral thinking) puzzles Wizbit is set often being presented to the audience at home, with the solutions being revealed towards the end of the episode. Wizbit's magic word was "Ostagazuzulum", and he came from the planet WOW, an acronym for "World of Wizards".

The show was created by Barry Murray, who had formerly been Mungo Jerry's record producer, with assistance from Daniels. Its theme tune is based on a song by Lead Belly, named "Ha-Ha This A Way", sung by Daniels. All rights to characters and designs were retained by Daniels, and the music rights by Murray.

During the show's cancellation in 1988, re-runs continues to air until 24th July 1989. A CGI revival of the series was announced in 2009 with a movie set for Summer 2010 with the production of the reboot was ready to being made in 2007 but they were both cancelled and the production of the Wizbit revival stopped. Books based on said revival have been released however.

The show has also aired overseas being shown in Singapore, Ireland and Malaysia as well as on British forces television in Germany and Cyprus.

Production for the series started in 1985.

Characters 
 Wizbit, a large yellow cone-shaped wizard's hat, voiced by Paul Daniels and played by Tony Friel

 Wooly, an  white rabbit, best friend of Wizbit, also voiced by Paul Daniels
 Wilbur, Wooly's younger brother
 Squidgy Bog, a purple swamp monster, voiced by Martin Daniels
 Professor Doom, a moustachioed evil genius and arch-villain who lives in a castle, which sits atop a giant stone fist in the sky. Played by Rob Inglis
 Jinx, Professor doom's cat.
 Badbit, an evil version of Wizbit generated by Professor Doom
 The Gatekeeper, a woman who guarded the gates to Puzzleopolis by refusing to let anyone in until they had solved a riddle, played by Vicky Licorish
 Madame Martinka, a fortune teller who owned the magic shop in Puzzleopolis
 Grocer Green, a greengrocer with green hair
 Pierre Oe, a mime artist
 Spoof & Bluff
 Paul Daniels (playing himself) who owned the theatre in Puzzleopolis
 Various townsfolk shaped like magician's props - spongeballs, dice, wands and so forth.
 Troll, a hideous and vicious purple haired hag.

References

External links 
 
 Retro Junk
 Jedisparadise

1986 British television series debuts
1988 British television series endings
1980s British children's television series
BBC children's television shows
Television shows shot at EMI-Elstree Studios
Fictional characters who use magic
British children's fantasy television series
British television shows featuring puppetry
British television magic series
English-language television shows